Butomopsis is a genus of plants in the family Alismataceae. It contains only one species, Butomopsis latifolia. native to tropical Africa (from Senegal to Sudan to Mozambique), South Asia (India, Nepal, Bhutan, Bangladesh), Southeast Asia (Java, Burma, Laos, Thailand, Vietnam, Yunnan) and northern Australia (Queensland and Northern Territory).

References

External links

Alismataceae
Alismataceae genera
Monotypic Alismatales genera
Flora of Africa
Flora of tropical Asia
Flora of the Northern Territory
Flora of Queensland
Flora of Yunnan